Christine Keiko Agena (born October 3, 1973) is an American actress. She is mostly known for playing Lane Kim in Gilmore Girls and NYPD medical examiner Dr. Edrisa Tanaka on FOX's crime drama Prodigal Son (2019–2021).

Personal life
Agena, of Japanese descent, was born in Honolulu, and began acting at the age of 10. She attended Mid-Pacific Institute preparatory school in Oʻahu, and Whitman College for one year as a drama major.

Agena married Shin Kawasaki in a helicopter over Las Vegas, Nevada on December 19, 2005.

Career
Agena is best known for her role in Gilmore Girls, where she played Lane Kim, a Korean-American teenager who is the best friend of Rory Gilmore, one of the lead characters. Agena played this role despite being significantly older than her character, who was 16 at the start of the series, when Agena was 27. Agena has also played the role of Mearing's Aide, Mearing being played by Frances McDormand, in Transformers: Dark of the Moon. Agena also appeared in three episodes of Felicity as Leila Foster, a girl who comes to the lead character for assistance in acquiring the morning-after pill and participates in a protest when denied the medication. She was a recipient of the Best Female Actor award in the Ammy Awards, which honor Asian and Asian-American achievement in film or television. She also provided the voice of Yori in the Disney cartoon series Kim Possible in seasons 2, 3, and 4 of the show. Also, Agena played Jun Ni in the movie Hair Show starring Mo'Nique. She guest-starred on Private Practice, Castle, and episode 12 of the final season of ER. She also appeared in Private Valentine: Blonde & Dangerous alongside Jessica Simpson as an army private. In 2010, she appeared onstage in No-No Boy in Santa Monica, California. She later appeared in an episode of House as Dr. Cheng.

While in Austin, Texas for the Gilmore Girls reunion panel at the 2015 ATX Television Festival, she also participated in two live tapings of the podcast Gilmore Guys, as well as a live performance by Lane Kim's band Hep Alien.

In September 2015, Agena launched Drunk Monk Podcast with fellow improv comedian Will S. Choi, wherein they watch every episode of the television series, Monk, while consuming alcohol. Agena plays a high school teacher in the Netflix series 13 Reasons Why.

She was featured in commercials for Verizon Wireless ("Flipside Testimonials: Apartment") in 2015 and UnitedHealthcare ("Pool Vault") in 2016.

Filmography

Video games

Awards and nominations

References

External links

 Keiko Agena's biography on filmbug
PopGurls Interview: Keiko Agena

1973 births
American film actresses
American television actresses
American video game actresses
Living people
Actresses from Honolulu
Whitman College alumni
20th-century American actresses
21st-century American actresses
American actresses of Japanese descent
American film actors of Asian descent